Jószef Karai (Budapest, 8 November 1927–7 September 2013) was a Hungarian composer. He studied composition with Ferenc Farkas at the Franz Liszt Academy.

References

1927 births
2013 deaths
Hungarian composers
Hungarian male composers
Musicians from Budapest